County Road 550 is an  county road in Ullensvang Municipality in Vestland county, Norway. The road runs from the village of Jondal to the town of Odda.

The route branches off from Norwegian County Road 5098 and follows the coast of the Folgefonna Peninsula. It runs north along the southeast side of the Hardanger Fjord to Utne and then turns south, running along the west side of the South Fjord to the town of Odda before meeting Norwegian National Road 13.

History
Before January 1, 2010, the route was a Norwegian national road. It was redesignated a county road after the regional reform of national roads.

National Tourist Route
The section of the road between Utne and Jondal has been designated as the Hardanger National Tourist Route together with the road from Steinsdal Falls in Kvam to Granvin on County Road 7 and the section from Låte Falls to Kinsarvik along National Road 13. The protected part of County Road 550 was built between 1874 and 1965.

References

External links
Statens vegvesen – trafikkmeldinger Fv550 (Traffic Information: County Road 550)

550
Ullensvang
550